Lullaby is a 2014 American drama film written and directed by Andrew Levitas, and starring Garrett Hedlund, Richard Jenkins, Anne Archer, Jessica Brown Findlay, Amy Adams, Jessica Barden, Terrence Howard, and Jennifer Hudson. The movie explores the right-to-die issues of a cancer-stricken Jewish patriarch who has decided to stop taking his medication and turn off his life support machines, and how his decision affects his family members' relationships with him and with each other.

Cast

 Garrett Hedlund as Jonathan
 Richard Jenkins as Robert
 Anne Archer as Rachel
 Jessica Brown Findlay as Karen
 Amy Adams as Emily
 Jessica Barden as Meredith
 Terrence Howard as Dr. Crier
 Jennifer Hudson as Nurse Carrie
 Daniel Sunjata as Officer Ramirez
 Frankie Shaw as Janice
 Darren Le Gallo as Ethan
 Maddie Corman as Beth
 Anne Vyalitsyna as Brooke
 Sterling Jerins as Young Karen
 Robert Bogue as Steven Lavipour
 Zac Ballard as Nicholas

Production
On February 6, 2014, ARC Entertainment announced that they have acquired all the North American distribution rights to the film.

Reception
Rotten Tomatoes, a review aggregator, reports that 32% of 28 surveyed critics gave the film a positive review; the average rating is 5.2/10. Metacritic rated it 35/100 based on 14 reviews.

References

External links
 

2014 films
2014 drama films
American drama films
2010s English-language films
2010s American films